Bacchisa albicornis is a species of beetle in the family Cerambycidae. It was described by Pascoe in 1867. It is known from Singapore.

References

A
Beetles described in 1867
Beetles of Asia